The Pushkin Statue in  in Riga, Latvia, was erected in 2009 as a gift from the city of Moscow. It was made by sculptor .

On 18 November 2022, the Embassy of the Russian Federation in Latvia posted pictures of the monument, painted with white and red paint, on social media. The State Police of Latvia has started an investigation into this case.
However, on November 25, a petition called “Demolition of the Pushkin monument” was posted on the community petition platform manabalss.lv. The author plans to hand it in to Riga City Council. On 12 March 2023, in a protest organized by the Latvian Russian Union around 200 people protested in front of Riga Town Hall against the statue's proposed removal.

References

External links 
 Monument to Alexander Pushkin
 Monument to Alexander Pushkin Labeled as Threat to Whole Europe

2009 sculptures
Sculptures in Latvia
Cultural depictions of Alexander Pushkin
Monuments and memorials in Riga
Statues of writers
Tourist attractions in Riga